The British Columbia carbon tax has been in place since 2008. It is a British Columbia policy that adds additional carbon taxes to fossil fuels burned for transportation, home heating, and electricity and reduces personal income taxes and corporate taxes by a roughly equal amount. The carbon tax is collected at the point of retail consumption (for example, at the pump for gasoline and diesel).  

British Columbia's policy is unique in North America; only Quebec has a similar retail tax, but it is set at a much lower rate and does not include a matching tax shift. Unlike most other governments, British Columbia's electricity portfolio largely consists of hydroelectric power, and its energy costs, even with the tax, are lower than in most countries.

History 
Public opinion polls in 2007 showed that the environment had replaced the economy and healthcare as the most important issue to a majority of respondents. The cultural change, which was brought about by greater media and political attention both inside and outside Canada, changed the political dynamic of British Columbia. Traditionally, the left-leaning BC New Democratic Party (NDP) had been seen as more green than the other of the two largest parties, the more free-market BC Liberal Party.  However, in 2008, it was the Liberals that introduced the carbon tax and tax shift, which was thought to be a more market-friendly method of regulating carbon than the competing idea of cap-and-trade, which the NDP supported. During the 2009 British Columbia election, the NDP suggested replacing the tax with a cap-and-trade system, and the BC Conservatives also made repealing the carbon tax part of their platform, but the Liberals won another majority government.

In 2016,  similar measure was put in the ballot in the neighbouring Washington State. Washington Initiative 732, like the British Columbia carbon tax, was to impose a steadily-rising tax on carbon emissions, while offsetting the state's sales tax and business tax/and to expand the state's tax credit for low-income families. The ballet initiative did not pass; however, another carbon tax plan, Washington Initiative 1631, has been proposed.

Initial implementation 
On February 19, 2008, the BC government announced its intention to implement a carbon tax of C$10 per tonne of carbon dioxide equivalent (CO2e) emissions (2.41 cents per litre on gasoline) beginning July 1, 2008, which made BC the first North American jurisdiction to implement such a tax. The tax was to increase each year until 2012 and reach a final price of $30 per tonne (7.2 cents per litre at the pumps).
Unlike previous proposals, the legislation was to keep the pending carbon tax revenue neutral by reducing corporate and income taxes at an equivalent rate. The government also planned to reduce taxes above and beyond the carbon tax offset by $481 million over three years.

2010 expansion
In January 2010, the carbon tax was applied to biodiesel. Before the tax actually went into effect, the BC government had sent out "rebate cheques" from expected revenues to all residents of British Columbia as of December 31, 2007. In January 2013, the carbon tax was collecting about $1 billion each year, which was used to lower other taxes in British Columbia. BC Environment Minister Terry Lake said, "It makes sense, it's simple, it's well accepted."

Rates 
Here are selected carbon tax rates by fuel:

In April 2019, the carbon tax increased to  e, which is translated below into different fuel types.

Effects
According to the World Bank, British Columbia's carbon tax policy has been very effective in spurring fuel efficiency gains. Further, the resulting decreases in fuel consumption did not harm economic growth. On the contrary, the province has outperformed the rest of Canada since 2008.

Five-year review 
A July 2013 report by Sustainable Prosperity, BC's Carbon Tax Shift After Five Years: An Environmental (and Economic) Success Story, suggested that the policy had been a major success. Since the tax had been in place, fossil fuel consumption had dropped 17.4% per capita and fallen by 18.8% relative to the rest of Canada. Those reductions occurred across all the fuel types covered by the tax, not just vehicle fuel. BC's rate of economic growth (measured as GDP) had kept pace with the rest of Canada's over that time. The tax shift enabled BC to have one of Canada's lowest income tax rates, as of 2012. Tge aggregate effect of the tax shift was positive of taxpayers as a whole.in that cuts to income and other taxes exceeded carbon tax revenues by $500 million from 2008 to 2012.

The report was released to coincide with an internal review of the policy by the BC government, which ultimately decided to freeze the tax at 2012 levels for five years. It was also aimed to influence energy policy discussion as the First Ministers met at Niagara-on-the-Lake, Ontario. Critics of the report debated its findings in media. Jock Finlayson of the BC Business Council pointed out that the drop in fuel consumption might be due to cross-border shopping, as many BC residents are able to drive into Washington or Alberta to fuel their cars and trucks, as well as to a much larger gasoline levy implemented Greater Vancouver (accounting for much of BC's population) to fund public transit development (TransLink) and that businesses were receiving fewer tax advantages from the plan than individuals. Aldyen Donnelly of WDA Consulting suggested that the success of the tax in reducing fuel consumption would cannibalize the potential revenue that it could generate, creating a tax waste, and that it fell more on the middle and lower-middle classes than on themaking which made it a regressive tax. Tge supporter Mark Jaccard of Simon Fraser University defended the tax by saying that BC's aviation fuel usage, which is not subject to the carbon tax, "did not diverge from the Canadian pattern, supporting the argument that the carbon tax really did have an effect. And BC's disconnect from the rest of the country was evident for all taxed fuels, not just gasoline; so the argument that BC's divergence is caused by increased cross-border shopping for gasoline is not supported." Also, statistical analysis can factor out things like weather, background economic conditions, and other policies.

Although fossil fuel consumption initially dropped rapidly, the recession in 2008 was also involved in lower consumption globally. A report in 2015 suggested an 8.5% reduction to date in greenhouse gas emissions, which may also be affected by cross border purchases of vehicle fuel.
Stats Canada reports that between 2007 and 2018 fuel consumption of gasoline in British Columbia has increased by 5.2%, while consumption in Canada as a whole increased 9.8%.

Ten-year review

A more recent assessment of the consumption of fossil fuel products as well as total GHG emissions has shown that that initial success has not been sustained. Based on data from Statistics Canada, gasoline consumption was 5,590,356 m3 in 2018. In 2007, the provincial gasoline consumption was 4,629,896 m3. That indicates that the consumption of gasoline has increased by approximately 20.7% since the carbon tax was introduced. Similarly, the consumption of diesel fuel has increased from 1,796,661 m3 in 2007 to 1,963,507 m3 in 2018. That indicated an increase in diesel consumption of approximately 9.3% since the carbon tax was introduced.

Based on the data, it is unsurprising that the total GHG emissions in British Columbia have also increased between 2007 and 2018. Based on the latest report from the BC government, the total GHG emissions in the 2007 base line year were 63,401 kTCO2e, which increased to 67,924 kTCO2e in 2018. That represents an increase in total GHG emissions of approximately 7.3% since the introduction of the carbon tax. The latest data also showed that the GHG emissions from the transportation sector had increased by approximately 23.6% from 2007 to 2018. Based on the most recent results, it is unclear if the carbon tax as implemented in BC has had a direct effect on the consumption of fossil fuel products as was reported in the earlier studies cited here.

See also 

 Carbon pricing in Canada

References

External links 
Government of British Columbia:
 British Columbia's Carbon Tax
 Carbon Tax Act
 Carbon Tax Regulation

Politics of British Columbia
2008 introductions
Emissions reduction
Taxation in Canada
Environmental tax
Tax reform